Dalcin is a surname. Notable people with the surname include:

Pierre-Emmanuel Dalcin (born 1977), French Alpine skier
Reinaldo Dalcin, Brazilian model and mechanical engineer

See also
Dallin